The Waiting Game was a Saturday night game show that aired on BBC One from 17 November 2001 to 15 June 2002 and it was hosted by Ruby Wax.

Gameplay

Round 1
Three teams of two start the game, with one player from each team at the buzzers and their teammates standing behind them. Wax asks a total of eight questions during this round. Once she finishes reading each question, a 10-second timer starts; the point value is determined by how long the players wait to buzz in. Values start at 1 point, then increase to 3, 5, 8, 12, and finally 15 points just before time expires. The timer is not shown to the teams, and the question value is only announced once a player buzzes in. That player's teammate must answer the question without conferring; a correct answer awards the points to that team, while a miss awards them to both opposing teams. For the last three questions, a miss automatically scores 15 points for the opposing teams regardless of the current question value.

After all eight questions have been asked, the team with the lowest score is eliminated. If, on the last question, the team in third place buzzes in so early that they cannot catch up, they are immediately eliminated without being permitted to answer. The round can end early if one team falls so far behind that they cannot at least tie for second place even by scoring all remaining points.

Round 2
The two remaining teams' scores are reset to zero. Game play is the same as round 1, except that the partners switch places, and only six questions are available. The team in the lead at the end of this round advances to the bonus round.

Bonus Round
Isolated from one another, the winning teammates try to answer a series of questions within 60 seconds, timed to 1/100 of a second. The timer begins to run only after Wax finishes reading each question, and stops when a player buzzes in or after 10 seconds have elapsed. The first player to buzz in must answer for him/herself, without conferring. Question values increase each second as follows:

£10
£50
£100
£200
£500
£1,000
£1,500
£2,000
£3,000
£5,000

As in the main game, the teammates are not shown the timer, and the question value is only revealed once a player buzzes in; in addition, the remaining time is announced before each new question. An incorrect answer, pass, or failure to buzz in after 10 seconds awards no money and wastes the time used on that question. If the team correctly answers six questions before time runs out, they win whatever money they have accumulated; otherwise, they forfeit all of their winnings and leave with nothing. The maximum possible winnings total is £30,000.

Transmissions

References

External links

2001 British television series debuts
2002 British television series endings
2000s British game shows
BBC television game shows